Franco Manuel Ascencio (born August 29, 1981) is an Argentine footballer who plays as an attacking midfielder, most recently for Alianza de Cutral Có of the Torneo Argentino B.

Personal life
Asencio is the older brother of the footballer Jeremías Asencio, who played for Chilean side Deportes Puerto Montt in 2020–21. They are of Chilean descent, since their grandparents are Chilean.

Titles
 CAI 2001–02 (Torneo Argentino A)

References

External links
 

1981 births
Living people
People from Comodoro Rivadavia
Argentine sportspeople of Chilean descent
Argentine footballers
Argentine expatriate footballers
Comisión de Actividades Infantiles footballers
Club Atlético Los Andes footballers
Santiago Wanderers footballers
San Luis de Quillota footballers
Primera B de Chile players
Chilean Primera División players
Argentine expatriate sportspeople in Chile
Expatriate footballers in Chile
Association football midfielders